Occam or Ockham may refer to:

People:
 William of Ockham (c. 1287–1347), English friar, philosopher and theologian, after whom Ockham's Razor is named
 Byron King-Noel, Viscount Ockham (1836–1862), British peer
 Peter King, 1st Baron King of Ockham (1669–1734), English lawyer, politician, Lord Chancellor of England

Places:
 Ockham, Surrey, England, a village believed to be the birthplace of William of Ockham
 Ockham Park, seventeenth century English country house in Ockham, Surrey

Other:
 HMS Ockham (M2714), one of 93 ships of the Ham-class of inshore minesweepers
 occam (programming language), also named after William of Ockham

OCCAM as acronym:
 Observatory for Cultural and Audiovisual Communication in the Mediterranean, established in 1996 by UNESCO in Milan
 Office of Cancer Complementary and Alternative Medicine, an office of the National Cancer Institute
 Oxford Centre for Collaborative Applied Mathematics, a research centre at the University of Oxford

See also
 Ockham algebra, bounded distributive lattice with a dual endomorphism
 Ockham Awards, annual awards by The Skeptic magazine
 Occam learning, model of algorithmic learning
 Ockham New Zealand Book Awards, series of awards to works of New Zealand citizens
 Occam process, a method for the manufacture of populated, printed circuit boards
 Occam's razor, a methodological principle named after the philosopher
 Ockham's Razor Theatre Company, an aerial theatre company